Carina OB1 is a giant OB association in the Carina Nebula, which is home to some of the most massive and luminous stars in the Milky Way Galaxy. It includes the young star clusters Collinder 228, NGC 3293, NGC 3324, IC 2581, Trumpler 14, Trumpler 15 and Trumpler 16, the last being the home of  Eta Carinae. It also includes another massive and luminous star, HD 93129A.

It is one of the largest known stellar associations, along with Sagittarius OB5 and Cygnus OB2. It is much easier to see than that of the other associations since Carina OB1 has relatively little dust extinction in its region. Together with Carina OB2, they compromise the most massive stellar grouping known in the galaxy.

It contains many hot luminous stars which share common characteristics.

References

Carina Nebula
Stellar associations
Carina (constellation)